This is a list of all the settlements in  Bedfordshire. Population figures are taken from the 2001 UK census and 2011 UK Census. Population figures are given for the civil parishes as well as urban areas. There is no data for some of the smallest civil parishes in the 2011 census. The ONS definition of an urban area is based on the continuously built-up area, and is as follows:- "The definition of an urban area is an extent of at least 20 hectares and at least 1,500 residents at the time of the 2001 Census. The starting point is the identification by OS (Ordnance Survey) of areas with land use which is irreversibly urban in character. This comprises  permanent structures and the land on which they are situated, including land enclosed by or closely associated with such structures; transportation corridors such as roads, railways and canals which have built up land on one or both sides, or which link built-up sites which are less than 200 metres apart; transportation features such as airports and operational airfields, railway yards, motorway service areas and car parks;  mine buildings, excluding mineral workings and quarries; and any area completely surrounded by builtup sites. Areas such as playing fields and golf courses are excluded unless completely surrounded by builtup sites. The prerequisite for the recognition of an urban area is that the area of urban land should extend for 20 hectares or more. Separate areas of urban land are linked if less than 200 metres apart. Land between built-up areas is not regarded as urban unless it satisfies one of the conditions listed above."

According to this definition of an Urban Area Bedfordshire contains two urban areas that have populations over 100,000.

See also
 Civil parishes in Bedfordshire

References

Settlements
 
Bedfordshire